Sogen Con was an annual three-day anime convention held during the summer months at the Sioux Falls Convention Center in Sioux Falls, South Dakota. It was originally based in Minnesota until moving before the 2007 convention. The name of the convention is based from the Japanese word for prairie, sogen.

Programming
The convention features artists, dances, dealers, panel discussions, Q&A sessions, video games, voice actors, and workshops.

History
In 2011, Sogen Con started a Kickstarter with the goal of raising $15,000 to cover the costs of the convention. The issues stemmed from the organizers (Otaku Incorporated) involvement in two less successful contentions, KakkoiCon and Minneapolis Anime Convention (M.A.C), which had financial and staff issues. The convention was able to successfully raise the money in two weeks.

Event history

References

External links
Sogen Con Website

Defunct anime conventions
Recurring events established in 2005
Recurring events disestablished in 2013
2005 establishments in Minnesota
South Dakota culture
Festivals in South Dakota
Culture of Sioux Falls, South Dakota
Tourist attractions in Sioux Falls, South Dakota